Abner W. McGehee (1779–1855) was an American planter, businessman and investor. A plantation owner in Georgia, he moved to Alabama to invest in iron mines and railroads.

Early life
Abner William McGehee was born on February 17, 1779, in Prince Edward County, Virginia. He grew up near the Broad River in the state of Georgia. His maternal uncle, John Scott, was the founder of Alabama Town, which merged with New Philadelphia to become Montgomery, Alabama, in 1819.

Career
McGehee was a planter, tanner and trader in Georgia. In the wake of the Treaty of Fort Jackson of 1814, he moved to Alabama. He established a plantation in Hope Hull, Alabama, named after his Methodist preacher.

Personal life
McGehee converted to the Methodist Church in 1809.

Death
McGehee died in 1855.

References

External links

1779 births
1855 deaths
People from Prince Edward County, Virginia
People from Montgomery, Alabama
American planters